Glipostena is a genus of beetles in the family Mordellidae, containing the following species:

 Glipostena congoana Ermisch, 1952
 Glipostena dimorpha Franciscolo, 1999
 Glipostena hogsbacki Franciscolo, 1999
 Glipostena medleri Franciscolo, 1999
 Glipostena nemoralis Franciscolo, 1962
 Glipostena nigricans Franciscolo, 2000
 Glipostena pelecotomoidea (Píc, 1911)
 Glipostena ponomarenkoi Odnosum & Perkovsky, 2009†
 Glipostena sergeli Ermisch, 1942

References

Mordellidae